Bahçeşehir Koleji Spor Kulübü, also known as Bahçeşehir Basketbol, is a Turkish basketball club based in Istanbul. The club plays in the Basketbol Süper Ligi (BSL), the highest level of basketball in Turkey. Bahçeşehir made its debut in the BSL in 2018 and made its debut in European competitions in 2019. Bahçeşehir won the FIBA Europe Cup in 2022.

The club is part of Bahçeşehir Koleji, a private school based in Istanbul.

History

In the 2017–18 season, Bahçeşehir reached the finals of the TBL for the first time. On 13 July 2018, Bahçeşehir received the vacant spot in the first-tier Basketbol Süper Ligi, after the withdrawal of Eskişehir Basket. This meant the club's first appearance in the domestic first tier. In the 2018–19 season, finished 9th in the BSL. In the 2019–20 season, Bahçeşehir made its European debut and played in the FIBA Europe Cup regular season. It is the first European participation for Bahçeşehir.

In the 2021–22 season, Bahçeşehir won the 2021–22 FIBA Europe Cup championship after defeating Pallacanestro Reggiana in the Finals.

Players

Current roster

Depth chart

Notable players 

  Yiğit Arslan (2022–present)
  Berkay Candan (2021–present)
  Deniz Kılıçlı (2020–2021)
  Rıdvan Öncel (2020–2021)
  Kartal Özmızrak (2021–present)
  Emir Preldžić (2018–2019)
  Oğuz Savaş (2021–present)
  Burak Can Yıldızlı (2020–2021)
  Mangok Mathiang (2019–2020)
  Andy Rautins (2019–2020)
  Jerry Boutsiele (2022–present)
  İsmet Akpınar (2020–2021)
  Jaka Blažič (2022–present)
  Alex Pérez (2020)
  Quino Colom (2018–2019)
  Chris Babb (2018–2019)
  Tarik Black  (2022)
  Sam Dekker (2021–2022)
  Erick Green (2020–2021)
  Manny Harris (2018–2019)
  JaJuan Johnson (2019–2020)
  London Perrantes (2019–2020)
  Thomas Robinson (2020)
  Jamar Smith (2021–present)
  D. J. White (2017–2019)

Head coaches
 Stefanos Dedas (2017–2019)
 Zafer Aktaş (2019–2020)
 Erhan Ernak (2020–2023)
 Sinan Atalay (2023–present)

Honours
Turkish Basketball First League
Runners-up (1): 2017–18
FIBA Europe Cup
Champions (1): 2021–22
Semifinalist (1): 2019–20

Season by season

 Cancelled due to the COVID-19 pandemic in Europe.

References

External links
Official website (in Turkish)
Official Twitter account

Basketball teams established in 2017
Basketball teams in Turkey
Sports teams in Istanbul